Hodgson may refer to:

People
Hodgson, a surname
List of people named Hodgson

Places
 Hodgson, Edmonton, a neighbourhood in southwest Edmonton, Alberta, Canada
 Hodgson, Manitoba, a village in Manitoba, Canada
 Hodgson Lake, a subglacial lake in Antarctica
 Hodgson Lake (Renville County, Minnesota), a lake in Renville County, Minnesota, United States
 Hodgson River, a river in the Northern Territory, Australia

Companies
 E. F. Hodgson Company, a 20th-century US mail-order company
 Ferrier Hodgson, an Australia-Asia Pacific accountancy company

Other
 2888 Hodgson, a main-belt asteroid
 Hodgson Report, a report by the Society for Psychical Research (SPR) in 1884
 USC&GS Hodgson (CSS 26), a coastal survey ship in commission in the United States Coast and Geodetic Survey from 1946 to 1967

See also
 Hodgsonia